Lollianus (sometimes rendered in English as Lollian) is a Roman personal name which may refer to many figures of classical antiquity, including:

Ulpius Cornelius Laelianus (Laelian), sometimes incorrectly called "Lollianus", emperor of the Gallic Empire in 269.
Lucius Hedius Rufus Lollianus Avitus, consul in consul AD 114.
Lucius Hedius Rufus Lollianus Avitus, consul in AD 144.
Quintus Hedius Rufus Lollianus Gentianus, suffect consul around AD 187.
Publius Hordeonius Lollianus, 2nd century philosopher and orator
Quintus Flavius Maesius Egnatius Lollianus Mavortius, consul in 355 AD.
Lollianus, 2nd century writer and author of the Phoinikika (Phoenician Tales).
St. Lollianus, one of the Seven Martyrs of Samosata, crucified with Saint Hipparchus and Philotheus, Abibus, James, Paregrus and Romanus by the emperor Maximian in 297.

External links
Historia Augusta biographical sketch of the pretender Lollianus
Seven Martyrs at Samosata, from Butler's Lives of the Saints

Ancient Roman prosopographical lists